is a former Japanese football player.

Playing career
Ono was born in Osaka Prefecture on May 22, 1978. After graduating from high school, he joined Japan Football League club Consadole Sapporo in 1997. Although he could not play at all in the match in 1997, the club won the 2nd place and was promoted to J1 League from 1998. He played many matches as center back from 1998. However the club was relegated to J2 League in a year. In 2000, he could hardly play in the match. In 2001, he moved to Montedio Yamagata. He played many matches in 2 seasons. From 2003, he played for Regional Leagues club Shizuoka FC and Okinawa Kariyushi FC. He retired end of 2005 season.

Club statistics

References

External links

consadeconsa.com

1978 births
Living people
Association football people from Osaka Prefecture
Japanese footballers
J1 League players
J2 League players
Japan Football League (1992–1998) players
Hokkaido Consadole Sapporo players
Montedio Yamagata players
Association football defenders